Luncile may refer to several villages in Romania:

 Luncile, a village in Lopătari Commune, Buzău County
 Luncile, a village in Chiojdeni Commune, Vrancea County

See also 
 Lunca (disambiguation)
 Luncani (disambiguation)
 Luncșoara (disambiguation)
 Luncavița (disambiguation)